Lissorhoptrus is a genus of rice water weevils in the family of beetles known as Erirhinidae. There are at least 20 described species in Lissorhoptrus.

Species
These 25 species belong to the genus Lissorhoptrus:

 Lissorhoptrus bosqi Kuschel, 1944 c
 Lissorhoptrus brevirostris Kuschel, 1951 c
 Lissorhoptrus buchanani Kuschel, 1952 i c
 Lissorhoptrus carinirostris Kuschel, 1951 c
 Lissorhoptrus chapini Kuschel, 1952 i c
 Lissorhoptrus erratilis Kuschel, 1951 c
 Lissorhoptrus foveolatus Duval, 1946 c
 Lissorhoptrus gracilipes Kuschel, 1951 c
 Lissorhoptrus insularis Kuschel, 1951 c g
 Lissorhoptrus isthmicus Kuschel, 1951 c
 Lissorhoptrus kuscheli O'Brien, 1996 c
 Lissorhoptrus lacustris Kuschel, 1952 i c b
 Lissorhoptrus lepidus Kuschel, 1951 c
 Lissorhoptrus longipennis Kuschel, 1952 i c
 Lissorhoptrus longitarsis Kuschel, 1951 c g
 Lissorhoptrus mexicanus Kuschel, 1951 c
 Lissorhoptrus oryzae Costa Lima, 1936 c
 Lissorhoptrus oryzophilus Kuschel, 1952 i c b (rice water weevil)
 Lissorhoptrus panamensis Kuschel, 1951 c
 Lissorhoptrus paraguayanus Kuschel, 1956 c
 Lissorhoptrus persimilis O'Brien, 1996 c
 Lissorhoptrus pseudoryzophilus Guan, Huang & Lu, 1995 c
 Lissorhoptrus robbinsorum O'Brien, 2014 c g
 Lissorhoptrus simplex (Say, 1831) i c
 Lissorhoptrus venezolanus Kuschel, 1956 c

Data sources: i = ITIS, c = Catalogue of Life, g = GBIF, b = Bugguide.net

References

Further reading

 
 

Brachyceridae
Articles created by Qbugbot